Sara Braverman (1918 – 10 February 2013) was a member of the Jewish Parachutists of Mandate Palestine. She was one of the first female fighters to serve in the Palmach and a founding member of the IDF Women's Corps.

Biography
Sara (Surika) Braverman was born in Botoșani, Romania to a Zionist family. As a 9 years old girl, she  joined Hashomer Hatzair and immigrated to Palestine in 1938 and started Agricultural training. She was a member of Kibbutz Shamir.

Military career

Braverman was one of 37 Palestinian Jewish parachutists sent by the Jewish Agency and Britain's Special Operations Executive (SOE) on military missions in Nazi-occupied Europe.

Awards and recognition
She was honored with lighting a torch on Israel's 62nd independence day in 2010, for her bravery in helping Jews during World War II.

See also 
 Jewish Parachutists of Mandate Palestine
 Women of Israel

References

1918 births
2013 deaths
People from Botoșani
Romanian Jews
Romanian emigrants to Mandatory Palestine
Women in World War II
Israeli female military personnel
Israeli soldiers
Mandatory Palestine military personnel of World War II
Palmach members
Jewish parachutists of Mandate Palestine
Special Operations Executive personnel